Simon Francis Carr (born 29 August 1998) is a British professional road racing cyclist, who currently rides for UCI WorldTeam . Although born in Hereford, England, to Welsh parents, he was brought up in the foothills of the Pyrenees and is bilingual in English and French. He currently races under the British flag with a French licence, but has declared himself as Welsh in a bid to compete in the 2022 Commonwealth Games.

Major results

2019
 1st Stage 1 Tour du Beaujolais
 1st Stage 4 Vuelta a Navarra
 2nd Overall Vuelta al Bidasoa
1st Stage 4
 10th Overall Tour de Savoie Mont Blanc
2020
 1st Prueba Villafranca de Ordizia
 1st  Young rider classification Volta a Portugal
2021
 8th Mont Ventoux Dénivelé Challenge
 9th Overall Route d'Occitanie
1st  Young rider classification
2022
 4th Overall Settimana Internazionale di Coppi e Bartali

Grand Tour general classification results timeline

References

External links
 
 

1998 births
Living people
Welsh male cyclists
Sportspeople from Hereford
British male cyclists
British emigrants to France
Sportspeople from Aude
Cyclists from Occitania (administrative region)